Aspilia is a genus of flowering plants in the family Asteraceae. Some authors have merged this genus with Wedelia, but others maintain that more study is required. Aspilia is native to Africa, Madagascar, and Latin America.

Medicinal uses 
Historically,  Aspilia africana was used in Mbaise and most Igbo speaking parts of Nigeria to prevent conception, suggesting potential contraceptive and anti-fertility properties. Leaf extract and fractions of A. africana effectively arrested bleeding from fresh wounds, inhibited microbial growth of known wound contaminants and accelerated wound healing process. Aspilia is thought to be used as herbal medicine by some chimpanzees.<ref>Raffaele Paul "Among the Great Apes",Harper, 2010 p98</ref>

 Species
List of Aspilia'' species:

References 

Heliantheae
Asteraceae genera